General Stockwell may refer to:

Clifton Inglis Stockwell (1879–1953), British Army brigadier general
Hugh Stockwell (1903–1986), British Army general
Hunt Stockwell, fictional lieutenant general appearing in the TV series, The A-Team